Pam Krueger is a creator, co-host, and executive producer of MoneyTrack, a half-hour TV series about personal finance and investing that has aired on 255 Public Broadcasting Service  public television stations nationwide. Krueger grew up in Cape Cod and currently lives in both Osterville, Massachusetts and Tiburon, California.

Early career 
Krueger began her career as a stock broker. In 2000, she made her move to broadcast television by producing and anchoring segments on Bay Area television networks; including ABC-TV's Marketplace, TechTV's The Money Machine, and the PBS series Money Moves. Krueger also produced IPO: Investing Pays Off, a children's financial series that earned a CINE award and an Emmy nomination in 2004.

MoneyTrack 
In 2005, Krueger launched MoneyTrack. Krueger wrote the foreword Getting on the MoneyTrack in October 2005 with Rob Black. Her first book, The MoneyTrack Method: The Real Person's Guide to Successful Investing, was released in October 2008.

Other Projects 
In 2014, Krueger developed Wealthramp.com to match consumers to fiduciary financial advisors. Krueger is the official spokesperson for the California Jump$tart Coalition, an organization dedicated to increasing financial literacy among children and teens. She is also a national spokesperson for the Institute for the Fiduciary Standard. In 2016, Krueger contributed the consumer's point of view to The Essential Advisor, a book by Envestnet president Bill Crager.

Awards 
Pam won a 2009 and a 2010 Gracie Award for Individual Achievement for Outstanding Producer of an Entertainment Series on Public Television.

The MoneyTrack series also picked up two Telly Awards, a Clarion Award, and two Communicator Awards for Season Two.

References

External links 
Pam Krueger's Biography
The MoneyTrack website
Krueger on CBS's The Early Show
Pam Krueger featured in MORE Magazine
Krueger interviewed in the Sacramento Bee: "MoneyTrack Host Seeks 'Everyday' People"
WealthRamp Official Site

Year of birth missing (living people)
Living people
Television personalities from California
American women television personalities
People from Barnstable, Massachusetts
People from Tiburon, California